New York Empire may refer to:

 New York Empire (AUDL), an ultimate team in the American Ultimate Disc League
 New York Empire (tennis), a team in World TeamTennis
 New York Hampton Surf, a team in the American Indoor Soccer League